Wohi Raat Wohi Awaaz is a 1973 Hindi horror film starring Samit Bhanja and Radha Saluja.

Music

External links

1973 films
Films scored by Sonik-Omi
1970s Hindi-language films